Digaro Mishmi may refer to:

 The Digaro tribe of the Mishmi people
 The Digaro Mishmi language